Smelling Salts is the second album by the Alternative Country band Trailer Bride, the first on Bloodshot Records.

Critical reception

AllMusic's Tim Sheridan gave Smelling Salts 3 stars out of 5, writing, "The real strength here is the insistent chime of Melissa Swingle's guitar against the elemental rhythm section of Brad Goolsby and Daryl White. At their best, they create the thick atmosphere of the Velvet Underground on a farm field trip."

Track listing
 "Quit That Jealousy" - 2:53     
 "Wildness" - 2:59     
 "Porch Song" - 2:57    
 "South of the Border" - 3:59    
 "From The Rooftop" - 3:58    
 "Graveyard" - 3:46     
 "Yoohoo River" - 3:12    
 "Cowgirl" - 4:24    
 "Show Bizness" - 3:41    
 "Bruises for Pearls" - 4:14     
 "Fighting Back the Buzzards" - 2:46

Personnel
 Brad Goolsby - drums, percussion, shaker, tambourine
 Melissa Swingle - vocals, banjo, harmonica, mandolin, slide guitar, saw
 Daryl White - acoustic bass, bass fiddle

ADDITIONAL PERSONNEL 
 Mike Beard - jaw harp, organ
 Tommy "Too Tall" Evans - guitar
 Gunther - barking 
 Bryon Settle - guitar

References

1998 albums
Trailer Bride albums
Bloodshot Records albums